The 2000 European Speedway Club Champions' Cup.

Group B

 May 7, 2000
  Rivne

Draw 1.  MC Marmande →  Signal - 2

Group A

 June 11, 2000
  Daugavpils

Draw.  AMTK Ljubljana →  Lokomotiv Daugavpils B

Final

 September 10, 2000
  Pila

See also

2000
Euro C